Whitehill Loch (NS 49240 33240), previously known as Hillhouse Loch was a freshwater loch in the East Ayrshire Council Area, now drained, near Galston, in the Parish of Riccarton, lying in a glacial Kettle Hole.

The loch
Whitehill Loch was one of several small lochs within the Parish of Galston, lying within a detached portion of the Parish of Riccarton, Ayrshire.

Cartographic evidence

Blaeu's Atlas of Scotland, 1654 shows a 'Hilhos Loch' lying between Hilhous (Hillhouse) and Whythil (Whitehill) in the baillary of Kyle, with a single outflow running into the Little Sorn Burn near Little Sorn. The estate policies of Cessnock and Carnell are shown to the west of the roughly circular loch. In 1857 the dwelling at Lochhouse is shown with a major ditch running down from the site of the loch and the stump of the original outflow and confluence with the Little Sorn Burn. The 1895 6" OS map shows a Lochhouse, abandoned by 1910 and now demolished, on the course of a major drain running down from the site of the loch down towards the Little Sorn Burn. A track ran up to Hillhouse Farm from the dwelling at Lochhouse. The satellite image of ploughed fields shows anaerobic soil markings typical of loch beds, etc.

The loch shore formed part of the boundary of the Parish of Riccarton. The 1971 OS map indicates the remnants of the loch as an enclosed marshy area, probably that retained for curling, drained through ditches leading down to the Little Sorn Burn.

Uses
Curling is recorded on Whitehill Loch, namely Loudoun v Tarbolton, on 25 February 1830. Craigmill Mill was located further down the Cessnock Water but does not appear to have been powered by the loch's waters.

Micro-history
The loch was drained for agriculture well before the nearby lochs of Bruntwood and Brown, last being recorded clearly circa 1654. The loch was drained through a culvert that was later converted to a pipe.

Views of Whitehill Loch site

See also
 Bruntwood Loch
 Loch Gate
 Loch Brown

References
Notes

Sources

External links
 Video of Whitehill Loch

Lochs of East Ayrshire
History of East Ayrshire
Former lochs